Sue Ellen Leurgans is a biostatistician known for her work on disorders of human movement, including those caused by occupational injury and Parkinson's disease. She is a professor of neurological sciences at the Rush University Medical Center in Chicago.

Leurgans graduated in statistics  from Princeton University, and earned her Ph.D. in statistics in 1978 from Stanford University. Her dissertation, Asymptotic Distribution Theory in Generalized Isotonic Regression, was supervised by Thomas W. Sager.

Leurgans is one of the authors of the 2007 revision of the Unified Parkinson's disease rating scale.
She was president of the Caucus for Women in Statistics in 1990. She is married to physicist Cosmas Zachos.

References

Year of birth missing (living people)
Living people
American statisticians
Women statisticians
Biostatisticians
Princeton University alumni
Stanford University alumni
Rush Medical College faculty